Antonio Bicchi is an Italian scientist interested in robotics and intelligent machines. He is professor at the University of Pisa and senior researcher at Istituto Italiano di Tecnologia in Genoa. He is an adjunct professor at the School of Biological and Health Systems Engineering of Arizona State University in Tempe, Arizona, US. He is a Fellow of IEEE since 2005, and received the IEEE Saridis Leadership Award and the “Ordine del Cherubino” from University of Pisa in 2019.

Early life
After obtaining a Laurea (magna cum laude) from the University of Pisa in 1984 and a Ph.D. from University of Bologna in 1988, Bicchi was with the Artificial Intelligence Lab of the Massachusetts Institute of Technology in Cambridge, MA, USA.

From 1990s to 2012 he directed the Research Center “E. Piaggio” at the University of Pisa where he was also chairman of the Robotics in the Department of Information Engineering. During his direction, the Center grew in size and in scientific prestige, leading it to count more than 100 researchers and manage over 60 fundamental and applied research projects.  

In 2009 he was appointed as senior scientist by the Istituto Italiano di Tecnologia in Genoa, where he created and leads the research line on Soft Robotics for Human Cooperation and Rehabilitation.

Since 2013 he serves as an adjunct professor of the School of Biological and Health Systems Engineering, Arizona State University in Tempe, Arizona, where he collaborates with Marco Santello and other colleagues in NSF and DARPA rehabilitation-oriented projects.

Research
Bicchi has contributed to the fields of automatic control (the science and engineering of systems), to haptics (the science and technology for the sense of touch), and to robotics, especially focusing on articulated soft robotics.

He has coordinated several important research projects funded by the EU in the FP7 and H2020 programmes, including CHAT (on the scalability, reconfigurability and security of distributed control for heterogeneous cyberphysical systems), PHRIENDS (on dependability and safety of physical human-robot interaction), THE Hand Embodied (on natural and artificial hands), and SoftPro (on the theory and open-source technologies for upper limb prosthetics and rehabilitation). He was scientific co-coordinator of several others, including TOUCH-HAPSYS (on haptics science and interfaces), WALK-MAN (on humanoid robots for disaster intervention), and SOMA (on soft manipulation systems).

His 2012-17 ERC AG project SoftHands used neuroscience and soft robotics technologies to develop a new generation of artificial hands. Two subsequent ERC PoC projects (SoftHands Pro-H and SoftHandler) explored the translation of these concepts in real-world products for prosthetics and industrial applications, respectively.

The ERC Synergy 2019 project “Natural BionicS” will produce the first completely integrated bionic limb system with direct spinal interfacing, through the cooperation of three groups at Imperial College (led by D. Farina), University Hospital Wien (O. Aszmann) and IIT (A. Bicchi).

Organizer and Educator
Bicchi was president of the Italian Society of Automatic Control, twice vice-president of the IEEE Robotics and Automation Society, and collaborates with major centers for technology transfer in the Italian and European industry. He is a consultant for the European Commission, the Italian Ministry of Education and Research (MIUR) and agencies in many countries in Europe, America and Asia for the scientific evaluation and accreditation of research centers and universities, research projects, and researchers' careers.

In 2005 he founded the WorldHaptics Conference, since then the largest biennial research meeting in the sciences of touch. In 2011 he started the series of conferences Automatica which is the main Italian event in the field of Automatic Controls. In 2015 he founded and was subsequently editor-in-chief of the IEEE Robotics and Automation Letters magazine, which in just two years has become the largest scientific journal in the entire field. In 2019 he co-founded the Institute of Robotics and Intelligent Machines (I-RIM), the association of researchers and industrialists in the field whose motto is "AI, fleshed out"

References

External links

20th-century births
Living people
Italian roboticists
Fellow Members of the IEEE
University of Pisa alumni
University of Bologna alumni
Massachusetts Institute of Technology faculty
Academic staff of the University of Pisa
Arizona State University faculty
Year of birth missing (living people)
Place of birth missing (living people)
European Research Council grantees